Jonkheer James Loudon (8 June 1824 – 31 May 1900) was a Dutch politician. He was Minister of Colonial Affairs in the Van Zuylen van Nijevelt-Van Heemstra cabinet (1861–1862), King's Commissioner in South Holland (1862–1871), and Governor-General of the Dutch East Indies (1872–1875). He was the father of politician John Loudon.

The ship Gouverneur Generaal Loudon (1875) was named after him.

He was made a Jonkheer in 1884.

Honors 
 Knight in the Order of the Netherlands Lion (1860)
 Commander in the Order of the Netherlands Lion (1862)
 Grand Officer in the Order of the Oak Crown (1868)
 Grand Cross in the Order of the Oak Crown (1871)
 Knight First Class in the Order of the Gold Lion of the House of Nassau (1879)

References 

1824 births
1900 deaths
Governors-General of the Dutch East Indies
King's and Queen's Commissioners of South Holland
Ministers of Colonial Affairs of the Netherlands
Politicians from The Hague